Robert Brunet (8 Mar 1903–1986) was a French racing driver between 1931 and 1951. Most of his 44 entries were Grands Prix, but he also entered the 24 Hours of Le Mans. He achieved a class victory and was fifth overall in the 1949 edition.

Personal life and work

In 1926, Brunet married the Countess of Choiseul, a rich noblewoman, with whom he invested in his racing career by buying a Bugatti. However, he did not become successful until 1933, when he purchased the Bugatti T51 previously owned by Jean-Pierre Wimille. In 1934, Brunet replaced Louis Braillard as head of Ecurie Braillard and raced with Benoît Falchetto for the following two years without achieving major results. Besides racing, Brunet lead a factory which produced capacitors for cars. With the help of contracts with the French army, it had 400 employees by 1947. After the war, the firm folded rapidly and declared bankruptcy in 1950. This meant Brunet could not afford his ordered Talbot-Lago T26C and he stopped racing soon after.

Racing results

References

Year of birth unknown
French racing drivers
24 Hours of Le Mans drivers
Mille Miglia drivers
1903 births
1986 deaths
Porsche Motorsports drivers